Francisco Igea Arisqueta (born 17 April 1964) is a Spanish politician of the Citizens party. A doctor by profession, he led the party in the 2019 Castilian-Leonese regional election, and became vice president of the Junta of Castile and León after forming a government with the People's Party leader Alfonso Fernández Mañueco. In the 2022 election, his party lost all their seats except his own. He was previously a member of the Congress of Deputies (2015–2019) and came runner-up in his party's 2020 leadership election.

Biography
Born in Valladolid, Igea graduated in Medicine from the University of Valladolid. A specialist in the digestive system, he worked at a hospital in Palencia as head of department until 2013, when he volunteered for redundancy due to cuts.

Igea contested the primaries to lead Union, Progress and Democracy in the 2015 Castilian-Leonese regional election, losing to Rafael Delgado. He then left the party, for Citizens. He was elected to the Congress of Deputies in the Valladolid constituency in December 2015. The following June, he was the only member of his party in Castile and León to win re-election. In January 2017, he entered his party's central committee, responsible for health.

In February 2019, Igea announced that he would challenge Silvia Clemente in the party primaries to lead in May's regional elections. In March, on a recount, he defeated the former People's Party regional leader. His party became the third largest in the Cortes of Castile and León behind the Spanish Socialist Workers' Party (PSOE) and the PP. In July, his party formed a government with the PP, and he became regional vice president.

In December 2019, a judge closed a case against Igea initiated by a party member who had accused him of threats in March.

Igea announced his candidacy in February 2020 for Citizens' leadership election, standing gainst Inés Arrimadas. She won by 76.9% to 22.3%.

At the end of 2021, Mañueco called an early election with the aim of governing alone, as his counterpart Isabel Díaz Ayuso had achieved in the Community of Madrid. Igea was named Citizens' lead candidate by the party's national leadership without the need of a primary, citing new rules in the party for when there is an unexpectedly short electoral campaign. The election ended up with Citizens losing all their seats except Igea's while Vox made gains; he offered to align with the PP to top Vox governing.

References

1964 births
Living people
People from Valladolid
University of Valladolid alumni
20th-century Spanish physicians
21st-century Spanish physicians
Union, Progress and Democracy politicians
Citizens (Spanish political party) politicians
Members of the 11th Congress of Deputies (Spain)
Members of the 12th Congress of Deputies (Spain)
Members of the 10th Cortes of Castile and León
Members of the 11th Cortes of Castile and León
Government ministers of Castile and León